Longnan Chengxian Airport  also known as Longnan Chengzhou Airport is an airport serving the city of Longnan in southern Gansu Province, China. The airport received approval from the State Council of China in July 2012, with a construction budget of 1.2 billion yuan. It was opened on 25 March 2018.

Facilities
Longnan Airport is classified as a 4C domestic regional airport.  It has a 3,500 square-meter terminal building and four aircraft parking spaces.  It is projected to handle 150,000 passengers, 500 tons of cargo, and 2,150 aircraft movements annually by 2020.

Airlines and destinations

See also
List of airports in China
List of the busiest airports in China

References

Airports in Gansu
Airports established in 2018
Longnan
2018 establishments in China